Firefighting has historically been a predominantly male profession throughout the world. However, since the 1970s, women have made inroads in both professional and volunteer fire departments in multiple countries. In modern times, women have served in a variety of fire service roles including as fire chiefs. Nonetheless, they comprise less than 20% of firefighters even in the countries where they are best represented.

History 
Many ancient civilizations had a form of organized firefighting. One of the earliest recorded fire services was in Ancient Rome. The Aboriginal Australians had been managing and responding to wildfires for thousands of years, with women being involved.

Firefighting became more organized from the 18th century onwards, led with the rise of insurance companies and then with the rise of government fire services in the 19th century. In 1818, Molly Williams was recorded as being the first female firefighter in the United States. As a slave in New York City, she joined a volunteer engine company. Young women in boarding houses in the United Kingdom were taught fire drills, including high ladder rescues. During World War II, women served in the wartime fire services of the United Kingdom, Australia and New Zealand both in support and frontline roles.

As a result of the second-wave feminism movement and equal employment opportunity legislation, official obstacles to women were removed from the 1970s onwards. The first female firefighter in the United Kingdom (Mary Joy Langdon) was recruited in 1976, while the first in New Zealand (Anne Barry) joined in 1981. Many fire departments required recruits to pass tough fitness tests, which became an unofficial barrier to women joining. This led to court cases in a number of countries.  In 1979 communications centre worker Anne Barry applied to join the NZ Fire Service as a career firefighter but her application was rejected on the grounds of gender. In 1981 she won her two year battle with the Fire Service Commission and was allowed to apply to join the New Zealand Fire Service as a career fire fighter.  In 1982, Brenda Berkman won a lawsuit against the New York City Fire Department over its restrictive fitness test. She and 40 others then joined as its first female firefighters. A similar lawsuit led to the Supreme Court of Canada ruling in 1999 (in the case British Columbia (Public Service Employee Relations Commission) v. BCGSEU) that fire departments could not use restrictive fitness tests unless they could justify the need for them.

Nevertheless, the percentage of women recruited by fire departments has been low. In the UK, women make up 5% of firefighters which is less than the percentage for police officers (29%), paramedics (38%) and military personnel (10%). A report by the London Fire Brigade found that discouraging factors included the portrayal of firefighting in the media, a lack of information available to young girls and unrealistic ideas about the role. Other issues include shift patterns that are not suitable for mothers with young children.

By country

Australia 
The Aboriginal Australians developed techniques for managing bushfires in the 60,000 years before the arrival of European settlers, with women being involved.

Amazon Ladies Fire Brigade 
Excluding these indigenous precursors, the first all-female firefighting crew was recruited in 1901 in Armidale, New South Wales. It was formed in response to a fire at Cunningham House in the same town. Known as The Amazons this volunteer crew complimented the all-male paid firefighting crew, and was the first example in Australia of male and female crews doing routine fire drills together using the same equipment. Station Officer Minnie Webb was the first female Captain in Australia. The creation of the Amazon Ladies Fire Brigade and their operational and dress uniforms was inspired by Captain Webb of the paid firefighting brigade in Armidale. Captain J.T.A. Webb became captain in 1898. He held this position until his death on 17 May 1924. He formed the first women's fire brigade in the early 1900s and also instructed the all-female brigade at the New England Girls School and the fire squad at The Armidale School in October 1923. Penrith Fire Museum  has an archived collection on Captain Webb's career. Webb immigrated from England, and where he had seen the trained female fire responders that were common at all-female British boarding schools (see United Kingdom, below on this page). The Amazons was a one-off local initiative and the Webb children were recruited into both the male and female brigades. The model was not adopted elsewhere in Australia. However, the Dubbo Dispatch and Independent Bulletin of 1905 reported that the Dubbo Brigades had attended in Dubbo with 'upwards of 70 Brigades' from across NSW, and an 'exhibition of hose and ladder...and life-saving' had been performed by the Amazon Ladies Brigade 

Unlike Britain, Australian jurisdictions did not establish voluntary female brigades during WWI, and despite great interest in the Amazons during 1901–1905, no other jurisdictions took up the idea. Captain Minnie Webb went on to become a nurse serving in WWI.

Women's fire auxiliaries in World War II 
As was the case in Britain, women's fire auxiliaries were established in World War II in most jurisdictions in Australia to fill vacancies created when male firefighters enlisted in the war. Tasmania was ordering uniforms for the Women's Fire Auxiliary in January 1940. On 20 August 1941, the Tasmania Women's Fire Auxiliary were part of a parade (a march-past) for Prime Minister of the United Kingdom Winston Churchill. Queensland established a Women's Fire Auxiliary in October 1941. Their duties were to include "driving and trailing vehicles to fires, repairing hoses, operating chemical extinguishers, looking after canteens, and extinguishing incendiary bombs". The Forestry Department of Western Australia recruited an all-female fire crew in Sawyers Valley. Initially only employed on weekends, they became full-time. In addition to fire suppression they carried out fuel reduction burning, firebreak maintenance, fire spotting and upgrading bush phone lines. In 1942 the WA Fire Auxiliary, made of up men and women, gave a demonstration of their skills. In the same year (1942) the Board of Fire Commissioners of NSW established the Women's Fire Auxiliary. Women served as volunteer firefighters in urban and rural locations across Australia and New Zealand. In New South Wales, recruitment took place in Wagga Wagga, Newcastle Wollongong and Broken Hill. A uniform, including a helmet, dress uniform hat, operational overalls and dress uniform jacket was provided. The Australian War Memorial has photos of the NSWFB uniform. Dorothy Barrett, organiser and Chief of the NSW Women's Fire Auxiliary was photographed in 1946 in uniform No book has been written about the female chiefs of the Women's Fire Auxiliaries, though Trove has established a 1947 press cuttings book. Also in 1942, South Australia established a Women's Fire Auxiliary and recognition was given to the vital role women were to play in emergency response. At the 2006 Women in Fire Fighting Conference, Childs curated a reproduction of historic uniforms.

In the post-war era, women remained unable to join fire services as paid firefighters, though there was a growth of local women's auxiliaries across Australia. In the 21st century, these women would be seen as providing operational support and contributing to community fire safety, but in the post-war era they were often portrayed and respected as tea ladies and sandwich makers. The women who volunteered made an important contribution to fire preparedness and response.

Modern developments
After the passage of the Sex Discrimination Act 1984, official limits on women joining were removed. In 1985, Heather Barnes, Denise Butcher, Dawn Maynard and Allison Meenahan joined New South Wales Fire Brigade (NSWFB) as Australia's first paid career firefighters. In 1998, the NSWFB (now Fire and Rescue NSW) appointed its first female station officers.

The first National Women in Firefighting Forum (thereafter known as WIFF) was held in 2005 at Sydney Airport with the theme of "Firing Up Women". It was opened with a keynote address by the Sex Discrimination Commissioner Pru Goward. A second conference was held in 2006 and included New Zealand female firefighters. The theme was "Same but Different". The first timeline of women in firefighting was created. A vote was unanimously recorded to establish a women in firefighting association run by and for female firefighters, and out of this vote Women and Firefighting Australasia (WAFA) was born. In 2007 the first Board of WAFA was established with Susan Courtney as its president.

Prior to 2005 most research, including health, uniform and risk research assumed all cohorts were male, with Robyn Cooper's work in 1997 an exception. From 2005 onwards, some research has been done into roles and challenges for female firefighters in Australia.

In 2006 Childs reported that less than 5% of any fire service in Australia was made up of full-time paid female firefighters, and also reported a web survey under the title "Not just fitting in". Ainsworth et al (2013) argued that in 2006 indicated that out of 33,659 volunteer firefighters, 3,798 (11%) were women. In 2011, this number had increased to 5,466 (14%). In 2015 a report by Women in Firefighting Australasia found that no fire agency had succeeded in improving the overall percentage about 5%. However, while overall total percentages had not been exceeded between 2006 and 2015, overall percentages across all fire services had improved. For example, the Northern Territory had improved from 0% to 2%.

The percentage of career female firefighters remain at or below 5% of Australian fire services agencies, despite the history and activism noted above. Controversy remains acute. Allegations of sexism and bullying remain. There has also been a movement towards setting physical standards based on evidence of what is necessary.

Notable moments 
 1901 – The Amazons was formed in Armidale NSW Australia
 1941–1945 Women's Fire Auxiliaries were established across Australian jurisdictions
 1945–1947 Pre-war bans on single and married women being employed in certain industries including firefighting, were reinstated as part of demobilisation
 1950-70s Many Women's Fire Auxiliaries were formed, such as the Morphett Vale and Districts EFS Ladies Auxiliary; and Burnside CFA SA Women who took a more active role learning basic firefighting and the operation of the radio room
 1977 – NSW Anti-Discrimination law passed
 1984 – The Australian Sex Discrimination Act was passed
 1985 – Heather Barnes, Denise Butcher, Dawn Maynard and Allison Meenahan became the first female firefighters in the NSWFB
 1987 – Adrienne Clarke became South Australia's first female professional firefighter with the Metropolitan Fire Service (SAMFS)
 1988 – The induction of the first professional female firefighters in the MFB took place in September (Names of women?)
 1992 – Melanie Goehr first professional female firefighter in NTFRS
 1994 – Kristen Appel appointed leader of an all-female firefighting team of NT Park Rangers in charge of Arltunga Historical Reserve East Macdonnell Ranges NT
 1998 – Vicki Hunter, Sally Foote and Dawn Maynard first female Station Officers in NSWFB
 1999 – Shameena Wells became the first Muslim woman in Australia to win first place at the NSWFB field day held at the NSW Fire Museum Penrith NSW
 2000 – 5 female firefighters of the NSW National Parks and Wildlife Service awarded a national Firefighting medal (names of women?)
 2001 – The first all-female and all-First Nations fire crew was established at Lake Tyers, Victoria
 2002 – The first female Aviation Rescue and Firefighting graduates were deployed by Air Services Australia (names of 2 women?)
 2004 – Jennifer Filmer awarded a Medal of the Order of Australia for 30 years service to rural fire in Victoria
 2004 – Viviene Raffaele was awarded the Australasian Fire Service Medal for services to firefighting in the ACT
 2005 – First Women in Firefighting Forum (WIFF)
 2005 – The WA Branch of the United Firefighters Union replaced the word 'firemen' with 'firefighter' on their website
 2006 – First Australasian Women in Firefighting Conference
 2008 – Michelle Young was appointed as the first female Station Officer with Queensland Fire & Rescue
 2014 – Charmaine Sellings, Rhonda Thorpe and Katrina Mullet, long time members of the all-female and all-First Nations firefighters of the Lake Tyers Brigades of the CFA Victoria, were awarded 10 year service medals
 2016 – Women made up 50% of the recruits graduating class of Fire and Rescue NSW (formerly NSWFB)

Austria 
A female fire brigade was formed in 1912, with an initial recruitment of 60 women. Women were admitted to volunteer fire brigades in 1978, and as professionals in 1993.

Canada 
The oldest fire department and fire insurance company as well as the longest-serving firefighters in Canada originated in Nova Scotia. The terms "smoke-eaters" and "leather lungs" were used to describe firemen who had no need to come out for fresh air, and this success was attributed to male facial hair that was thought to act as a "watery sponge" that held fresh air. Since they lacked this facial hair, women were unable to earn these titles.

In the late 1800s, many fire halls, including ones in Nova Scotia, united to compete in sports and physical challenges relating to fire fighting. However, it would not be until over one hundred years later, during the feminist movements of the 1960s, that the absence of women in contact sports was questioned.

A "boys' club" culture existed in many fire departments, as the majority of the firefighters were white males. The firefighters were held to strict standards and were fined (or could even be fired) for spitting on the floor, being late to meetings, and being drunk on or off duty. However, many of the firefighters would support each other by not reporting another member when they were intoxicated.

In 1999, the Supreme Court of Canada ruled in British Columbia (Public Service Employee Relations Commission) v. BCGSEU that a mandatory fitness test for those seeking to become firefighters in British Columbia unfairly discriminated against women. The test had been based on the physiology of male firefighters. The Court ruled that employers must show that any required workplace tests are necessary, and that there has been some effort to accommodate individuals.

Female-focused camps to train young women in firefighting skills have been created by fire departments in Ottawa and London, Ontario, and have led to similar camps being established in the U.S.

Currently, only 3% of firefighters in Canada are women. Many female firefighters have reported facing resistance when they try to move up in rank, feeling the need to be overqualified in order to compensate for their gender and to prove that they were hired based on merit and not simply an attempt at diversification. Female firefighters also report experiencing bullying, harassment, and sexual harassment on the job.

France 
In 2015, 3% of firefighters were women, with 6.4% of these women holding the title of fire officer.

Germany 
Volunteer female firefighters worked in Berlin and Breslau during World War I but ceased at the end of the war. Women were again recruited during World War II, especially as drivers. This continued until 1955 when they had all been replaced by men. In the German Democratic Republic (GDR), women were extensively used both in support roles and as frontline firefighters. Women continued to take up all roles in the 1990s. The first recorded female firefighter in Berlin was Tanja Grunwald, in April 1994. Female professional firefighters now number about 1,000 (2.3%), with approximately 80,000 volunteers (10%).

Norway 
The first documented female firefighters in Norway joined the fire services during the 1980s. In 2011, 3.7% of the Norwegian firefighters were women.

Hong Kong 
The Hong Kong Fire Services Department started recruiting women for control and ambulance staff in the 1980s; however, the first firewoman was not hired until 1994.

As of 2003, there were 111 uniformed females, but only 8 were operational firefighters.

India 
In 2002 Harshini Kanhekar became the first women firefighter of India.

In 2003, the Tamil Nadu Fire and Rescue Services permitted women to join and a appointed Priya Ravichandran as a Divisional Fire Officer, making her one of the first female fire officers in the country, and the first one to win the Anna Medal for Bravery.
In the same service Meenakshi Vijayakumar has attended more than 400 incidents and in 2013 was awarded the President’s Fire Service Medal for Gallantry.

In 2009, a proposal was mooted in the Municipal Corporation Chandigarh to allow women into the fire services.

In 2012, the Mumbai Fire Brigade inducted five women firefighters, making them the first in the history of the organisation.

In 2013, the department inducted its second batch of women firefighters.

Iran

Japan 

As of 2003, the Tokyo Fire Department (TFD) – the second biggest fire department in the world – had 666 female firefighters, or 3.8% of the total.

In 2009, as part of a recruitment drive, it was stated that there were 17,000 female fire service staff, though it is not clear how many of these were operational rather than support roles.

In 2015, the TFD had 18,700 active firefighters. Only 1,200 (6.4% of the operational force) were women.

The first woman was appointed to the Kawasaki Fire Department rescue unit in 2016.

All of these however are office staff and not engaged in actual firefighting

Netherlands 
Women firefighters have been serving in the Netherlands since at least 1939.

In 2000, women accounted for 3.3% of professional firefighters.

New Zealand

Overview 
New Zealand has a high proportion of female firefighters; in 2021, 6% of career firefighters and 20% of volunteer firefighters were female. The Women in Fire and Emergency New Zealand (WFENZ) represents women in the organisation and to national and international agencies. The organisation is also currently performing a study to identify areas to improve progression for female staff. However, in 2019, a report found that Fire & Emergency New Zealand, the national fire brigade, had a "bullying culture", and in particular had a high prevalence of misogynistic bullying.

Notable moments 

 1943 - Dargaville Volunteer Fire Brigade forms New Zealand's first all-female brigade, formed of 11 Women's War Service Auxiliary members.
 1964 - Nine women form the Ahipara Fire Party, the first post-war all-female brigade.
 1968 - Five women join the Brunner Volunteer Fire Brigade as operational crew; this is the first known instance of a mixed gender fire brigade. The United Fire Brigades Association (UFBA) refused to recognise the women's service.
 1972 - Brunner VFB table a motion at the national UFBA conference to recognise female firefighters. The UFBA responds that it was "considered inappropriate that women should be fulfilling the traditional fireman's role".
 1979 - A modified motion to allow women to be recognised as firefighters from Brunner VFB is accepted by the UFBA, recognising the many women who were working as volunteer firefighters by this point.
 1979 – Fire communications centre worker, Anne Barry, applied to join the NZ Fire Service as a career firefighter and her application was rejected on the grounds of gender.
 1979 - A number of women compete for the first time in New Zealand at a provincial United Fire Brigades Waterways Competition – Tokomaru Bay, East Coast.
 1981 – July Sapper Jan Graham of the Royal New Zealand Engineers becomes the NZ Army’s first full time female firefighter.
 1981 July 27th – Anne Barry won her 2yr battle with the Fire Service Commission and was allowed to apply to join the NZFS as a career fire fighter.
 1981 November 4th –  Elizabeth England and Anne Barry completed the NZFS recruit course, with overall placings of 2nd and 3rd respectively, becoming New Zealand’s first female career firefighters, and the first female career firefighters in Australasia.
 1985 – Julie Croswell was appointed as the third female firefighter.
 1988 – Nella Booth and Sheralee Rickaby were appointed as the fourth equal female firefighters. Booth was appointed to Petone Station, Wellington Fire Region and Rickaby was appointed to Upper Hutt, Wellington Fire Region, of the NZ Fire Service.
 1989 – Christine Hewson became the New Zealand Fire Service’s first volunteer Station Officer of the Hawea Volunteer Fire Brigade.
 1993 – July. Christine Hewson became the New Zealand Fire Service’s first female Chief Fire Officer (CFO) when she was appointed as Chief of the Lake Hawea Volunteer Fire Brigade. Christine had served in the Brigade since May 1979.
 1995 - Nicky Lafferty joined the NZFS career staff at Silverdale Fire Station, Auckland.
 1998 – Nella Booth was appointed as the first career firefighter Station Officer (SO, Fire Safety) of the NZ Fire Service, Central Fire Station, Auckland.
 1998–2008 Nella Booth was Chair of New Zealand Fire Service Women.
 1999 – Allana Ranui was appointed New Zealand Fire Service’s first Maori female CFO, for the Murupara Volunteer Fire Brigade.
 1999 – Alison Timms was appointed acting Chief Executive of the New Zealand Fire Service, holding the position until 2001.
 2001 – 28 April Rosemary Higgins becomes New Zealand’s first female 25yr Gold Star recipient. She joined the British Fire Service since 1959, and upon moving to New Zealand in 1975, she joined the Hamilton Fire Brigade in the Communications Centre. She was the only uniformed woman in Hamilton for nearly 17 years. When she retired from the Communication Centre, she joined the Pauanui Volunteer Fire Brigade.
 2001 – May Nella Booth convened a group of career female firefighters in Auckland to discuss the possibility of setting up a support/network group. Many topics were discussed over the two days of the meeting, and one outcome was the formation of New Zealand Fire Service Women (NZFSW).
 2005 – Nella Booth (SO), Senior FF Megan Tate and (1 other female ff) attended the first Women in Firefighting Conference in Sydney as representatives of New Zealand Fire Service Women (NZFSW).
 2006 – Nella Booth (SO) joined the Steering Committee of the Australasian Women in Firefighting Conference, Sydney Australia, and gave the closing address of the conference.
 2008 – September. Rochelle Martin was appointed as the NZFS' first female career operational firefighter to hold the rank of Station Officer (SO).
 2015 - Rochelle Martine was appointed as the NZFS' first female career Senior Station Officer (SSO). Six other women now hold career Station Officer rank,.
 2015 – New Zealand Fire Service Women (NZFSW) was reformed as Women in Fire and Emergency New Zealand (WFENZ)

Pakistan 
Shazia Parveen, who hails from Vehari District in Punjab, joined the Rescue 1122 emergency services as a firefighter in 2010. This made her the first female firefighter in Pakistan.

Saudi Arabia 
In 2018, two Saudi women became the first certified female firefighters in Saudi Arabia meeting the [Saudi] National Fire Protection Association’s Professional Qualifications Standards.

United Kingdom 
In Great Britain, Girton Ladies' College had an all-women's fire brigade from 1878 until 1932. In 1887 it was reported that women employed in a cigar factory in Liverpool had been formed into a fire brigade, and had effectively extinguished a fire at the factory.
During World War I, women's brigades carried out firefighting and rescue in the South of England. During the 1920s, women firefighting teams were employed by private fire brigades. At the beginning of World War II, 5000 women were recruited for the Auxiliary Fire Service, rising to 7,000 women in what was then the National Fire Service. Though trained in firefighting, women were not there for that purpose, but rather for such positions as driving and firewatching. Many received awards for heroism.

In the modern era, some of the first women to participate in firefighting were based at Gordonstoun School near Elgin in Scotland. The school's staff and pupils had participated in a volunteer unit of the local Grampian Region Fire Brigade (GRFB) since the school's return from Wales in 1948. In 1972, the school accepted girls as pupils for the first time and from 1975 women were accepted into the voluntary firefighting unit. They were not initially allowed to be official members of the GRFB, but could operate only within the school. The turning point took place in 1976, when the scale of a forest fire on Ben Aigan near Craigellachie on Speyside led the GRFB to seek volunteers from the local community to help fight the fire. Alongside personnel from local Royal Air Force bases, a group of trained women firefighters from Gordonstoun attended. The performance and endurance of this group over seven days and nights of firefighting led the GRFB to agree to allow women to take on official front-line firefighting roles for the first time. The drought of the same year led to a call for extra firefighters and prompted other brigades to allow women to join. Mary Joy Langdon joined the East Sussex Fire Brigade on August 21 as a retained firefighter and was described by the press as Britain's first female firefighter.
She was the first woman to be an operational firefighter in Britain.

In 1978, it was announced that women would be accepted into the fire service. Josephine Reynolds became the country's first female wholetime firefighter when she joined Norfolk Fire and Rescue Service in the early 1980s, after a year of training.

In 1996, Fleur Lombard became the first female firefighter to die in peacetime service in Britain.

In 2002, the Equal Opportunities Commission submitted a seven-page submission to the Independent Review of the Fire Service criticizing numerous practices which contributed to the extremely low recruitment of women and racial minorities in the fire service. In particular, the Commission highlighted the system of long day and night shifts, which likely discouraged women with children from applying, and the practice of only allowing those with firefighting experience to move into the higher ranks, which meant that control staff were ineligible.

In 2004, Dany Cotton became the first woman to be awarded the Queen's Fire Service Medal. 

In 2011, Ann Millington became the first female chief fire officer, taking charge of the Kent Fire and Rescue Service. In 2016, Rebecca Bryant was appointed to lead the Staffordshire Fire and Rescue Service; she was the first female CFO to be a former frontline firefighter, while Station Manager Sally Harper received the Queen's Fire Service Medal. In 2017, Dany Cotton became Commissioner of the London Fire Brigade.

In 2017, 5.2% of operational firefighters in the UK were women, an increase from 3.1% in 2007. There were 300 female firefighters in the London Fire Brigade, amounting to 7% of the total.

United States 
The first known female firefighter in the United States was in the early 1800s. She was an African American slave from New York, named Molly Williams, who was said to be "as good a fire laddie as many of the boys." In the 1820s, Marina Betts was a volunteer firefighter in Pittsburgh. Then, in 1863, Lillie Hitchcock was made an honorary member of the Knickerbocker Engine Company, No. 5., in San Francisco in 1863.

The first paid fire company was in Cincinnati, Ohio in 1853, and was all men. Women remained volunteer for years after. In the 1910s, there were women's volunteer fire companies in Silver Spring, Maryland, and Los Angeles, California.

During World War I, many women entered the workforce to replace the men who were fighting overseas. This resulted in thousands of women working in traditionally male-dominated professions, for example, the military hired approximately 11,000 women by 1918 for clerical work.

In 1936 Emma Vernell became the first official female firefighter in New Jersey, after her husband died in the line of duty.

During World War II, some women served as firefighters in the United States to replace male firefighters who joined the military; and during part of the war, two fire departments in Illinois were all-female. In 1942, the first all-female forest firefighting crew in California was created.

In the 1960s, there were all-female fire companies in Kings County, California, and Woodbine, Texas. During the summer of 1971, an all-female Bureau of Land Management (BLM) firefighting crew fought fires in the wilds of Alaska. Furthermore, an all-female United States Forest Service firefighting crew fought fires in 1971 and 1972 in Montana.

Over 100 years after the first paid male firefighter, Sandra Forcier became the first known paid female firefighter (excluding forest firefighting) in the United States, and began working in North Carolina in 1973 for Winston-Salem Fire Department. Forcier was a Public Safety Officer, a combination of police officer and firefighter. The first woman to work solely as a paid firefighter (excluding forest firefighting) was Judith Livers, hired by the Arlington County, Virginia fire department in 1974.

Brenda Berkman took legal action against a discriminating physical test of the New York City Fire Department in 1982. After winning the case, she and about 40 other women became the first female firefighters in the history of New York City. Berkman was also the founder of the United Women Firefighters and the first openly gay professional firefighter in America.

Chief Rosemary Bliss was the first female head of a career fire department in Tiburon, California. She became fire chief in 1993.

In 2002, approximately 2% of all firefighters were female in the United States.

Sarinya Srisakul was the first Asian-American woman to be hired by the New York City Fire Department in 2005.

In 2013, Los Angeles Mayor Eric Garcetti vowed to make sure that 5% of the Los Angeles Fire Department's firefighters were women by 2020. As of 2018 3.1% of the department's firefighters were women. In 2022, Kristin Crowley became the first female, and the first openly gay, chief of the Los Angeles Fire Department.

In 2015, the New York City Fire Department had 58 women, representing less than 0.5% of the 10,000 active operational firefighters. That same year, Regina Wilson became the first woman president of the Vulcan Society (an African-American firefighting association). In 2022, Laura Kavanagh became the first female commissioner of the New York City Fire Department.

As of 2016, 7% of firefighters in the United States were women.

South Korea 

In 2019, Jung Moon-ho, the commissioner of National Fire Agency, said, "We will increase the proportion of women by 10% of the prefecture as there are many demands for recruiting firefighters regardless of gender". As of the end of October 2018, the number of firefighters in South Korea was 48,146. Of these, 3,610 women (7.5 percent) were women.

Turkey

The first known female firefighter in the Ottoman Empire was Tulumbacı Bahriye. She worked voluntarily in the fire brigade (Tulumbacılar) from 1884 until 1892.

In modern times, Sabiha Yalçın became the first female firefighter in Turkey in İzmit in 1988.

In 1999, the İzmir Fire Department hired the first woman firefighter of that city, Devrim Özdemir. By the year 2007, the number of the city's firefighters who were female was six.

In 2013, the Gaziantep Fire Department hired the first woman firefighter of that city, Fatma Doğan.

In 2021, 37 women joined the İstanbul Fire Department as the first women firefighters of the city.

Terminology 
For much of the last century, firefighting was a male-dominated or exclusively male profession. As such, firefighters were commonly called "firemen", an informal title still used by some civilians today. The title "firefighter" has become the universally accepted terminology in NFPA training materials and is used by English speaking professionals and trained volunteers as both the basic rank and overall job title that is often paired with the addition of a firefighter's EMT certification level (e.g., "Firefighter-Paramedic Jane Doe").

Challenges 
Since women have only begun to be widely hired or accepted as volunteer firefighters in the last 30–40 years, there have been many difficult adjustments for the fire service. In many places, the fire service is steeped in tradition and formalized, paramilitary relationships. A 1998 article in Fire Engineering noted that firefighters tend to form tight-knit communities which value "strength, courage, and loyalty" but can be "resistant to change". Even if women are socially accepted members of the fire service, it is on the basis of gendered assumptions that they will bring more balanced decision making and nurturing qualities to a team of firefighters.

Health 
In 2017, a study of female firefighters' occupational stress in the U.S. found that 40% of the women had engaged in binge drinking in the previous month, and 16.5% screened positive for problem drinking. According to the study, "problem drinkers were more than 2.5 times as likely to have been diagnosed with a depressive disorder or to have symptoms of post-traumatic stress." Those with less than seven years of service were the most likely to report issues with drinking.

In Canada, a lack of health coverage is often an issue for female firefighters in certain provinces. Although many cancers are covered as known occupational risks because of overexposure to fire, smoke, and toxic fumes, breast cancer is not yet covered nationwide.

Although women in the fire service are generally more healthy and fit than their male coworkers as well as women in the wider population, they experience higher rates of miscarriage and preterm births. This may be linked to occupational hazards such as environmental toxins, heavy lifting, and irregular shift work. In 2012, the International Association of Firefighters in the U.S. recommended that all fire departments create policies on pregnancy and/or maternity leave, but in a study in 2018 nearly a quarter of female firefighters reported that their departments had no such policies.

Facilities and equipment 
One major hurdle to entrance into firefighting for women was the lack of facilities. The immediate problem of sleeping quarters and bathing areas had to be solved before women could participate fully in firefighting as an occupation and as a culture. Communal showers and open bunk halls were designed for men only. Today, fire stations, as public entities, must either follow gender equity law or face judicial injunctions; thus, they are now designed to accommodate firefighters of both genders. However, some female firefighters still face issues related to their gender.

A pan-Canadian study found that equipment, services and resources for female firefighters are often inadequate. Gear is often not made for women and offsite there is often no proper facilities for feminine hygiene needs.

Discrimination 
Women were banned from working as firefighters in many countries at many times. For example, from 1945–1947 in Australia pre- war bans on single and married women being employed in certain industries including firefighting were reinstated as part of demobilisation.

As a result of the second-wave feminism movement and equal employment opportunity legislation, official obstacles to women were removed from the 1970s onwards. For example, in 1979 communications centre worker Anne Barry applied to join the New Zealand Fire Service as a career firefighter and her application was rejected on the grounds of gender, but in 1981 she won her two year battle with the Fire Service Commission and was allowed to apply to join the New Zealand Fire Service as a career firefighter. However, many fire departments required recruits to pass tough fitness tests, which became an unofficial barrier to women joining. This led to court cases in a number of countries. In 1982, Brenda Berkman won a lawsuit against the New York City Fire Department over its restrictive fitness test. She and 40 others then joined as its first female firefighters. A similar lawsuit led to the Supreme Court of Canada ruling in 1999 (in the case British Columbia (Public Service Employee Relations Commission) v. BCGSEU) that fire departments could not use restrictive fitness tests unless they could justify the need for them.

A 2015 study on women in the wildland firefighting profession in Australia found that 55% reported seeing gender discrimination of others, while 45% reported experiencing it themselves.

Sexual dimorphism 
There have been occasional charges of some departments lowering standards so that they could hire more women. In 2005, Laura Chick (the LA City Controller) stated in a report that Fire Chief Bamattre lowered physical requirements for female recruits and ordered that women be passed even if they failed their tests. However, many female firefighters reject any form of accommodation or special treatment, in part because they wish to prove themselves in the same way as their male counterparts, and in part because they fear it will make them a target for harassment.

Sexual harassment 
Studies have found that women working in male-dominated professions, such as firefighting, experience more sexual harassment that those working in traditional female professions. This increased rate of harassment is worsened further when women are in the minority, as they often are in the fire service, because the majority group in such circumstances tends to view those in the minority as token representatives of their group rather than individuals.

In a survey conducted by Women in the Fire Service in 1995, 551 women in fire departments across the U.S. were asked about their experiences with sexual harassment and other forms of job discrimination. Eighty-eight percent of fire service women responding had experienced some form of sexual harassment at some point in their fire service careers or volunteer time. Nearly 70% of the women in the survey said that they were experiencing ongoing harassment at the time of the study. Of the 339 women who indicated that they had complained about harassment, only a third (115 women) listed positive-only outcomes: investigating/taking care of the problem and disciplining the harasser. Twenty-six percent said that they were retaliated against for having reported the incident.

Many Canadian female firefighters admit to experiencing some levels of systemic gendered violence such as sexual harassment and assault, which includes groping and being solicited for sexual services. Female firefighters who experience harassment have been found to be more hesitant to report it because they fear negative consequences such as exclusion and the exacerbation of the harassment. Many female firefighters have reported avoiding feminine apparel such as high heels, dresses, and makeup when around their male coworkers, for fear of being hypersexualized and becoming the target of sexual assault or harassment.

In 2016, a Canadian male firefighter was charged with two counts of sexual assault and one count of assault with a weapon in connection with his harassment of a female coworker.

An American nationwide study found that the majority of female firefighters that experience sexual harassment do not report it to their superiors, in many instances because the supervisor was involved in or already knew about the behavior. When harassment was reported, no formal action was taken in the majority of cases.

Sexually harassed female firefighters are significantly more likely to report experiencing job stress.

Additional notable female firefighters 
Lillie Hitchcock Coit – American. Volunteer firefighter in San Francisco, in the 1920s and beyond.
Dany Cotton – British. First woman to win the Queen's Fire Service Medal, highest ranking operational female firefighter in the country.
Molly Williams – American. First known female firefighter in the United States.

See also
Women in the military

References

External links 

Women in the Fire Service, Inc.
United Women Firefighters Collection (WAG.057) Tamiment Library & Robert F. Wagner Labor Archives, New York University